Fair Snape Fell is one of the larger hills in the Forest of Bowland in Lancashire, England. It occupies a position in the very south of the main range of fells, alongside and just to the north of Parlick, to which it is joined by a ridge. The main paths approach the summit from Parlick in the south, Saddle Fell in the east and Bleasdale in the valley to the west. The Saddle Fell approach is as boggy as the hills to the north. The summit is covered in grass and peat groughs.

The word snape means ‘pasture’; thus Fair Snape Fell means ‘fell of the fair (beautiful) pasture’.

Considerable areas of the Bowland fells were used for military training during
World War II and there are still unexploded bombs in some areas, including nearby Wolf Fell.

 

Marilyns of England
Hills of the Forest of Bowland
Mountains and hills of Lancashire
Geography of the Borough of Wyre
Geography of Ribble Valley